Pardini Arms is an Italian firearms manufacturer founded in the beginning of the 1980s by Giampiero Pardini, a prominent marksman in Italian target shooting. The company specializes in firearms for competition use, producing air pistols, air rifles, small-caliber and large caliber handguns. Their pistols are known for their characteristic swept-back grips and low bore axis.

Usage
Several of the firm's products are competitive at the international level, with seven medals being won by athletes equipped with Pardini's guns at the 2016 Summer Olympics. In another example, during the 2010 ISSF World Shooting Championships, approximately two-thirds of the rapid fire athletes used a Pardini pistol.

Products

FPE – FPM variant compliant with UK firearms regulation
FPM – target pistol in .22 LR with a compensator
 GPR1 – air rifle in .177 caliber
GT9 / GT40 / GT45 – competition pistol in 9mm, .40 S&W and .45 ACP
 HP – target pistol in .32 S&W
K10 / K12 – air pistols in .177 caliber
KID – youth air pistol in .177 caliber
SP – target pistol in .22 LR

Gallery

References

Further reading

External links
 
 Pardini Guns - SP Bullseye pistol via YouTube
 Review: Pardini GT9 - The *best* 9mm range gun you can buy via YouTube

Firearm manufacturers of Italy
 
Sporting goods manufacturers of Italy